The Bismarck Expressway is a state highway in Mandan and Bismarck, North Dakota, in the United States. It carries two unsigned highways: Interstate 194 (I-194) from its west end at exit 156 of I-94 to I-94 Business (I-94 Bus.) in Mandan, and North Dakota Highway 810 (ND 810) from I-94 Bus. in Mandan, around the south side of Bismarck back to I-94 Bus. in Bismarck. I-94 Bus. takes the designation from the end of ND 810 to the designation's eastern terminus at I-94 and US Highway 83 (US 83). The portion in Mandan, even where it is ND 810, is a freeway; once it crosses the Missouri River into Bismarck, it becomes a four-lane surface road.

Route description

The Bismarck Expressway starts at a trumpet interchange with I-94's exit 156 and begins to run southeast through the eastern portion of the city of Mandan. The road parallels the Missouri River as it passes under a railroad operated by BNSF Railway. Farther south, the highway interchanges with I-94 Bus. (Memorial Highway), where the I-194 designation ends. ND 810 shares a diamond interchange with McKenzie Drive, then curves to the east and crosses the Missouri River. Upon doing so, it leaves Mandan and Morton County, and enters Bismarck and Burleigh County.

The roadway becomes a four-lane surface road east of the Missouri River, beginning at the road's first intersection east of the river, with Washington Street. The Bismarck Expressway and ND 810 continue east and intersect ND 1804 at a one way pair with 9th and 7th streets. The roadway then rolls farther to the east, before bending to the northeast and passing over the BNSF line and Hay Creek. It then turns north and intersects Main Avenue. At this intersection, ND 810 terminates, while I-94 Bus. joins from the east and continues north.

Exit list

References

External links

I-194
I-194 North Dakota

Roads in North Dakota
Mandan, North Dakota
Interstate 94